Deep River is an unincorporated community in Ross Township, Lake County, Indiana.

History
Deep River, originally called Woodvale, is a community that sprang up around a mill started by John Wood in 1835.

References

Unincorporated communities in Lake County, Indiana
Unincorporated communities in Indiana